Peter McNamara was the defending champion, but did not participate this year.

John McEnroe won the title, defeating Ivan Lendl 6–1, 6–3 in the final.

Seeds

  Ivan Lendl (final)
  John McEnroe (champion)
  Mats Wilander (first round)
  Kevin Curren (first round)
  Eliot Teltscher (second round)
  Bill Scanlon (first round)
  Johan Kriek (quarterfinals)
  Gene Mayer (quarterfinals)

Draw

Finals

Top half

Bottom half

References

 Main Draw

1984 Grand Prix (tennis)
Donnay Indoor Championships